Hambone's Meditations was a comic strip produced from 1916 to 1968, and syndicated initially by the McClure Newspaper Syndicate and later by the Bell Syndicate. Produced by two generations of the Alley family, the one-panel cartoon originated with the Memphis, Tennessee, newspaper The Commercial Appeal, where it ran on the front page. He dispensed folk wisdom in caricatured dialect.

Publication history 
Hambone's Meditations was created by J.P. Alley, the first editorial cartoonist of The Commercial Appeal. The character of Hambone was inspired by Alley's encounter with a philosophical former slave, Tom Hunley of Greenwood, Mississippi. Hunley told a Works Progress Administration interviewer how he met J. P. Alley:

The strip and character were popular enough that Hambone's image was used on a variety of products, including sweets and cigars, in the 1920s and 1930s.

When the elder Alley died April 16, 1934, his wife Nona and sons Cal Alley and James P. Alley, Jr. took over the strip.

Four Hambone's Meditations strip collections were published, in 1917, 1919, 1934, and 1972.

Story and characters 
Hambone's Meditations was inspired by cartoonist Kin Hubbard's Abe Martin of Brown County (syndicated 1904 to 1930), a hillbilly antihero prone to wisecracks jokes and the utterance of popular sayings. The thrust of Hambone's Meditations was essentially similar, transposed onto a Southern rural African-American stereotype. Hambone was depicted as disheveled in appearance, with wide eyes and exaggerated large lips.

The introduction to the 1919 strip collection, published by Jahl & Co., typifies the majority white readership's relationship to Hambone's Meditations:

Controversy and cancellation of the strip 
Historian Michael Honey described the humiliation felt by African Americans due to by Hambone's Meditations:

The presence of Hambone on the front page of the Commercial Appeal was noted unfavorably by journalist Garry Wills while covering the aftermath of Martin Luther King's assassination. 

Pressure from D'Army Bailey and civil rights groups—including marchers in the Memphis sanitation strike chanting "Hambone just go!"—brought the long-running cartoon series to an end in 1968.

In popular culture 
Luther Dickinson released an album in 2012 titled Hambone's Meditations (Songs of the South Records). It was nominated for the 2013 Grammy Award for Best Folk Album.

See also 
 Ching Chow
 Portrayal of black people in comics
 Uncle Tom
 Minstrel show
 Jim Crow

References

External links 
 "J. P. Alley - Cal Alley ... Editorials and Hambone," Historic-Memphis.com
 "Hambone's Meditations," Jim Crow Museum of Racist Memorabilia website, Ferris State University
 "Hambone Fantasies & Fakes: A National Cigar Museum Exposé," CigarHistory.info

1916 comics debuts
1968 comics endings
American comic strips
American comics characters
Black people in comics
Fictional African-American people
Gag-a-day comics
Male characters in comics
Stereotypes of African Americans